Xestia trifida is a moth of the family Noctuidae. It is found in Romania, Ukraine, southern Russia, Turkey and Turkmenistan as well as the Iberian Peninsula.

Subspecies
Xestia trifida hispanica Fibiger, 1993 (Portugal, Spain)
Xestia trifida trifida (Fischer von Waldheim, 1820)

External links
Fauna Europaea
Noctuinae (Noctuidae) collection of Siberian Zoological Museum
noctuidae.net

Xestia
Moths of Europe
Moths of Asia